Katherine Ella Chaney (born 21 January 1975) is an Australian independent politician, who was elected to the Australian House of Representatives at the 2022 Australian federal election, succeeding Liberal Party MP Celia Hammond in the division of Curtin.

Chaney is the granddaughter of Fred Chaney Sr., who served as a member of the House of Representatives from 1955 to 1969 and as Lord Mayor of Perth from 1978 to 1982; and is the niece of Fred Chaney, who was deputy leader of the Liberal Party from 1989 to 1990 and served as a minister in the Fraser Government.

Early life and career
Chaney was born on 21 January 1975 in the United States. Her father is Michael Chaney, a businessman. Her father's brothers include Fred Chaney, a former Liberal Party Senator for WA, and Member for the Division of Pearce. Her grandfather is Fred Chaney Sr., who was a Liberal Party MP and minister in the Menzies government. On her mother's side, her great grandfather is Hubert Parker (Ministerialist) and his father is Stephen Henry Parker (Nationalist/Liberal), both of whom served in the Parliament of Western Australia.

Chaney attended John XXIII College and the University of Western Australia. In 1998, after graduating university, she joined law firm Blake Dawson Waldron in Sydney. In 2003, she finished an MBA and moved to the Boston Consulting Group as a strategic advisor. She later became General Manager Business Development at Westralia Airports Corporation, managing company of Perth Airport. She then moved to Wesfarmers, working there as Aboriginal affairs manager and sustainability manager. From 2017 to 2022, she worked as the director of innovation and strategy for Anglicare WA.

Political career
In December 2021, Curtin Independent was formed to search for an independent candidate for the Division of Curtin, a seat held by the Liberal Party for almost all of its existence. At the time, the seat was held by Celia Hammond. Curtin Independent was part of a wider movement of political community engagement groups formed ahead of the 2022 Australian federal election to field independent candidates. On 27 January 2022, Curtin Independent announced that Chaney was selected by the group to run as an independent candidate for Curtin.

Her election campaign spent almost A$1 million, including $350,000 from Climate 200.

Supporters of Chaney during the election campaign included Fred Chaney, who wrote an opinion piece in WAtoday, The Sydney Morning Herald, and The Age supporting her and saying that the Liberal Party has "lost its way". The Greens encouraged their supporters to preference Chaney ahead of other candidates by putting her second on their how-to-vote cards.

At the 2022 election, which was held on 21 May 2022, Chaney was elected as the member for Curtin, defeating Hammond with 51% of the two-candidate-preferred vote to Hammond's 49%.

Political views
Chaney describes herself as economically sensible and socially progressive. Her major election issues included action on climate change and integrity in politics.

Personal life
Chaney lives with her three children and husband.

See also
Electoral results for the Division of Curtin
Teal independents

References

External links
 Ms Kate Chaney MP at Parliament of Australia

Living people
21st-century Australian politicians
Independent members of the Parliament of Australia
Members of the Australian House of Representatives for Curtin
Women members of the Australian House of Representatives
Members of the Australian House of Representatives
1975 births
21st-century Australian women politicians